The Telling Room: A Tale of Love, Betrayal, Revenge, and the World's Greatest Piece of Cheese is a book by Michael Paterniti about a Spanish cheese, Páramo de Guzmán, and its maker, first published in July 2013. It was featured on BBC Radio 4's Book of the Week during January 2014.

References

2013 non-fiction books
Cheese
Books about food and drink
Books about Spain
Dial Press books